Panchakot Mahavidyalaya, established in 2001, is the general degree college in the Purulia district. It offers undergraduate courses in arts, commerce and sciences. It is affiliated to Sidho Kanho Birsha University.

History
Panchakot Mahavidyalaya has been established in the month of September 2000, mainly on the strength of public donation. The establishment of the college owes a lot to the generous help and active co-operation of the local people and the dedicated efforts of some visionaries of the district of Purulia. Special thanks are due to the Government of West Bengal and The University of Burdwan for their spontaneous positive response that effectively materialized in the establishment of this long dreamt institution of higher education. Thanks are also due to those who have generously donated their valuable land and money to this noble purpose. We must mention the generous sanctions from University Grants Commission, Higher Education Deptt, Govt. of West Bengal, MPLAD & BEUP schemes, Zilla Parishad, Purulia, Backward Class Welfare Deptt, and District Youth Office, with which a major portion of the infrastructure is built or under construction. We have been accredited by NAAC with grade-B w.e.f. 04.03.2015.

Location
The college is situated near the foothills of Panchet Pahar at the northernmost of the Purulia district. Physically it is located at Sarbari More beside Purilia-Barakar Road on one side and Panchet-Madhukunda Road on the other. The nearest railway station, Madhukunda is about 5 Km. from the Mahavidyalaya. The Campus of the College contains about 8 acres of land on which the tri-radiated two-storied building of about 48000 sq. ft. is located centrally. In fact, the plan of the building is so amazing that it draws visitors frequently. A three-storied Boys‟ Hostel is running within the campus funded by the Higher Education Dept., Govt. of West Bengal. A two-storied Girls‟ Hostel (funded by the UGC) is operational since 2015.  Rapid advancement our institution has gained pace with registration under 2 (f) and 12B of University Grants Commission.

Departments

Science

Computer Science Honours
Zoology Honours
 Computer Science General
 Zoology General
 Chemistry General
 Botany General
 Physics General
 Mathematics General

Arts and Commerce

 BENGALI HONOURS
 ENGLISH HONOURS
 HINDI HONOURS
 HISTORY HONOURS
 GEOGRAPHY HONOURS
 PHILOSOPHY HONOURS
 POLITICAL SCIENCE HONOURS
 COMMERCE HONOURS
 BENGALI GENERAL
 ENGLISH GENERAL
 HINDI GENERAL
 HISTORY GENERAL
 GEOGRAPHY GENERAL
 PHILOSOPHY GENERAL
 POLITICAL SCIENCE GENERAL
 SANSKRIT GENERAL
 SANTALI GENERAL
 COMMERCE GENERAL

Accreditation
The college is recognized by the University Grants Commission (UGC).
The College been accredited (cycle-I) by NAAC Peer Team in early December'2014 and awarded Grade-B(2.28) in March 2015.

See also

References

External links
 Panchakot Mahavidyalaya
Sidho Kanho Birsha University
University Grants Commission
National Assessment and Accreditation Council

Colleges affiliated to Sidho Kanho Birsha University
Educational institutions established in 2001
Academic institutions formerly affiliated with the University of Burdwan
Universities and colleges in Purulia district
2001 establishments in West Bengal